Mahasen may refer to:

 Cyclone Mahasen, a cyclonic storm in the Bay of Bengal in 2013, but was later renamed Cyclone Viyaru due to political reasons.
 Mahasena of Anuradhapura, a king of Sri Lanka who ruled the country from 277 to 304 AD.